Vesa is a unisex given name. It is used as a masculine given name and a surname in Finland. Notable people with the name are as follows:

Given name

Male
 Vesa Hanski (born 1973), Finnish swimmer
 Vesa Heikinheimo (born 1983), Finnish football player
 Vesa Hellman (born 1970), Finnish wheelchair curler
 Vesa Jokinen (born 1970), Finnish singer
 Vesa Kanniainen (born 1948), Finnish academic 
 Vesa Kokko (born 1964), Finnish wheelchair curler and curling coach
 Vesa Koskela (born 1960), Swedish boxer
 Vesa Lahtinen (born 1968), Finnish ice hockey player
 Vesa Leppänen (born 1951), Finnish wheelchair curler
 Vesa Mäkäläinen (born 1986), Finnish basketball player
 Vesa Mäkipää, Finnish ski-orienteering competitor 
 Vesa-Matti Loiri (1945–2022), Finnish actor and musician
 Vesa Pulliainen (1957–2010), Finnish football player
 Vesa Ranta (born 1973), Finnish drummer
 Vesa Rantanen (born 1975), Finnish pole vaulter
 Vesa Rosendahl (born 1975), Finnish speed skater
 Vesa Tauriainen (born 1967), Finnish football player
 Vesa Toskala (born 1977), Finnish ice hockey player
 Vesa Törnroos (1982–2020), Finnish sports shooter
 Ville-Vesa Vainiola (born 1985), Finnish ice hockey player
 Vesa Välimäki (born 1968), Finnish academic
 Vesa Vasara (born 1976), Finnish football player and manager
 Vesa Vierikko (born 1956), Finnish actor
 Vesa Viitakoski (born 1971), Finnish ice hockey player
 Vesa Ylinen (born 1965), Finnish motorcycle rider

Female
 Vesa Luma (born 1986), Kosovo-Albanian singer and songwriter

Surname
 August Vesa (1878–1918), Finnish journalist and politician
 Emilia Vesa (born 2001), Finnish ice hockey player
 Yrjö Vesa (1898–1967), Finnish engineer and businessman

Finnish masculine given names
Surnames from given names
Unisex given names